Janice Marchman is an American politician who is a member of the Colorado Senate for the 15th district. Elected in November 2022, she assumed office on January 9, 2023.

Early life and education 
Marchman was born on a United States Air Force base while her father was serving as a pilot. She earned a Bachelor of Science degree in industrial and systems engineering from Georgia Tech.

Career 
Prior to entering politics, Marchman worked as a business consultant and master scheduler. She joined the Thompson School District in 2016, where she teaches math and computer classes part-time. She was elected to the Colorado Senate in November 2022, defeating incumbent Republican Rob Woodward.

References 

Living people
Democratic Party Colorado state senators
Women state legislators in Colorado
Systems engineers
Educators from Colorado
People from Loveland, Colorado
People from Larimer County, Colorado
Year of birth missing (living people)